Rachel Rourke (born ) is an Australian female volleyball player. She is part of the Australia women's national volleyball team.

She participated in the 2014 FIVB Volleyball World Grand Prix.
On club level she played for Incheon Pink Spiders in 2014.

References

External links
 Profile at FIVB.org

1988 births
Living people
Australian women's volleyball players
Place of birth missing (living people)
Oregon State Beavers women's volleyball players
Expatriate volleyball players in China
Expatriate volleyball players in South Korea
Expatriate volleyball players in the United States
Australian expatriate sportspeople in China
Australian expatriate sportspeople in South Korea
Australian expatriate sportspeople in the United States